Baharagora is a village in the Baharagora CD block in the Ghatshila subdivision of the East Singhbhum district, in the Indian state of Jharkhand.

History
Baharagora CD block was established in 1956.

Geography

Location
The Subarnarekha River flows along its adjoining areas (approx at a distance of ).

It is situated on the south-east corner of Jharkhand.

Baharagora is the entry point of Jharkhand from the two states, namely West Bengal and Odisha, as it is located at the border, West Bengal is approx  and Odisha is approx  from there.

Civic administration
There is a police station at Baharagora. 

The headquarters of Baharagora CD block is located at Baharagora village.

Demographics
According to the 2011 Census of India, Baharagora had a total population of 1,132, of which 571 (50%) were males and 561 (50%) were females. Population in the age range 0-6 years was 128. The total number of literate persons in Baharagora was 899 (89.54% of the population over 6 years). 

(*For language details see Baharagora block#Language and religion)

Dialect spoken: Bahraagi

Transport
Baharagora is a very important hub for transport as National Highway 6/Asian Highway 46 passes through here and almost all the Transport Companies have their transit hub here. National Highway 18 connects NH 6 at Baharagora and NH 2 at Barhi, Jharkhand. It is connected to Baripada in Odisha by NH 18.

The nearest railway stations are Chakulia , Ghatsila , Jhargram , Kharagpur , Tatanagar  & Kolkata (Howrah) .

Nearest International Airport Kolkata, Netaji Subhas Chandra Bose International Airport.

Education

Schools
 Jawahar Navodaya Vidyalaya, Balikuria
 Kasturba Gandhi Balika Vidyalaya, Baharagora
 Kumardubi Darkhuli High School, Kumardubi
 Saraswati Shishu Vidya Mandir, Baharagora
 Saraswati Shishu Mandir, Bankati (Mouda)

Colleges
 Baharagora College, Baharagora

Culture
 Chitreshwer Shiv Mandir - .

 Baharagora Krishi Mela.* Baharagora Krishi Mela

References

External links 
 baharagora.com

Villages in East Singhbhum district